Tecumseh Historic District may refer to the following properties on the National Register of Historic Places:

Tecumseh Historic District (Tecumseh, Nebraska), listed in Johnson County, Nebraska

Michigan
Tecumseh Downtown Historic District, listed in Lenawee County
Tecumseh Historic District (Tecumseh, Michigan), listed in Lenawee County